Ayame (彩女, a homophone of the word for "iris" meaning "colorful female") is a player character in the Tenchu series of stealth games. Introduced in Acquire's Tenchu: Stealth Assassins in 1998, Ayame is a young prodigy assassin in a historical fantasy version of the 16th century Japan, who has been adopted by a ninja master and raised along with her partner Rikimaru to serve a local clan's lord. She is one of the lead characters in all subsequent installments of Tenchu except of Tenchu Z and has been well received by gaming mass media, often perceived as one of the top assassins and best female ninja characters in video games.

Appearances

In the Tenchu series
Ayame's story begins when a young shocked girl, unable to remember anything but her name and age, is discovered by Master Shiunsai of the small Azuma school of ninjutsu (Azuma Shinobi-ryu) in the desolate ruins of Kyoto after it was devastated by the Ōnin War (1467–1477) during the Muromachi period. Shiunsai finds himself unable to neither leave or help her and so he eventually decides to take her with him and train her to become a kunoichi (female ninja). Ayame is the most raw-talented of Shiunsai's students, including his other students Rikimaru and Tatsumaru. Despite her late start and bad attitude, she is initiated into the circle of ninja when she is only 12. Ayame becomes known for her sharp tongue and quick, deadly techniques, with a set of skills very different from Rikimaru, as she is faster and weaker but more cunning and aggressive than him, using a unique style of acrobatic, smooth attacks.

Chronology-wise, the first game in the series is 2000's Tenchu 2: Birth of the Stealth Assassins, which begins just while Ayame completes her final exam. Soon after her initiation as a ninja, however, turmoil falls as her duties to Lord Gohda and duties to her love Tatsumaru fall apart. Ayame's character changes from a laid-back girl into a more mature woman.

Deep down within her cold and distant exterior remains a broken heart. She lies in question towards Tatsumaru, the man who she vowed at youth to marry under a blossom tree. She would call him due to her deep infatuation of the elder student. After the incident and when she confronted him he brushed her off, unknowingly to her, he lost his memory and was a pawn at the time. This has deeply impacted her even though she remained silent. She carried this pain within, making her a colder and more proficient killer.

Her story continues in 1998's Tenchu: Stealth Assassins, as seven years have passed since Ayame has lost her master Azuma Shiunsai and her love interest Tatsumaru. Now 21-year-old, Ayame is tough and sarcastic, killing her enemies cold-blooded without the sign of any doubt or hesitation, though she knows feelings like love, sadness and desperation. She has developed a strong relationship Lord Gohda's daughter Princess Kiku, as if she was her younger sister after the death of Princess Kiku's mother Lady Kei, and Ayame swears to protect her at any cost from any harm.

In 2003's Tenchu: Wrath of Heaven (Tenchu: Return from Darkness on the Xbox), set one year later, Ayame is the sole remaining Azuma Ninja in the care of Lord Gohda after Rikimaru's disappearance, tasked to search for his body. She later pairs up with the returning Rikimaru.

During the events of 2004's Tenchu: Fatal Shadows, Ayame was patrolling the border of Lord Gohda's territory when she happened upon a burned ninja village. At first considered an enemy by the young survivor Rin, they later ally to discover who was behind the attack.

At the end of 2008's Tenchu: Shadow Assassins, Princess Kiku is killed by Rikimaru after she was used as a human shield by the series' recurring villain Onikage. In the game's extended ending, Ayame is shown speaking in Onikage's voice, suggesting that this traumatic experience caused her to be possessed by him when he was killed.

Ayame is also playable in the spin-off games Tenchu: Time of the Assassins (2005), Tenchu: Dark Secret (2006) and Shadow Assault: Tenchu (2008). She is an only playable character in the mobile game Tenchu: Ayame's Tale (2005). Yuka Eda portrayed Ayame in a stage play adaptation Tenchu Butai in 2014.

Other appearances
PVC figures of Rikimaru and Ayame, sculpted after their appearances in Wrath of Heaven by Keiji Iwakure, were manufactured and released by Kotobukiya in mid-September 2003; although categorized as action figures, these only feature movable wrist joints. Ayame was also featured in the girls of gaming special of play magazine that same year.

Ayame was included in Activision's 2004 video game True Crime: Streets of LA as an optional "skin" for its main character Nick Kang. She also made a cameo appearance in From Software's 2010 video game 3D Dot Game Heroes.

Character design
The character was originally designed by Koushi Nakanishi. In the Tenchu games, Ayame "tends to be more nimble but less powerful" than her male counterpart Rikimaru, who is slower but stronger than her. She is also to compensate with being able link her attacks into combos. In Fatal Shadows, however, there are no gameplay differences between Ayame and Rin. She has dark hair and eyes, usually wearing a sleeveless vest and baggy trousers, and armed her twin knives. 

Asked about what is he most proud of regarding Ayame's appearance in Tenchu: Wrath of Heaven, the game's director Mitsuo Kodama said: "I am most proud of the balance of innocence and violence that we were able to capture in Ayame's character design. She is at an age, 21, where she is starting to emerge from her innocence and see the true world. I am also proud of how she looks in her costume and how it fits with her design. Most female characters her age would seem out of place with such a dark, heavy black costume." In Stealth Assassins, Ayame can be equipped with a "Sexy Armor" outfit with the use of a cheat code.

Reception
The character was very well received by media. According to a retrospective article by CraveOnline, Rikimaru and Ayame were "like Batman with all their decoys, dog whistles, disguises, grappling hooks and other toys, an essential part of the ninja experience that had been missing from video games for far too long." The two were included among mentioned in 2008 article by GamesRadar's Mikel Reparaz about the gaming's top assassins as "probably the most realistic depiction of ninjas ever to appear in a videogame." GameZone's Robert Workman included both "the young, beautiful Ayame and the older, much more experienced Rikimaru" in his 2011 list of "best video game ninjas" as they "both are awesome when it comes to battle [and] they can sneak around better than most anyone on this list."

Joystiq's JC Fletcher described her in Shadow Assassins as a "totally hardcore stone-cold killer" and scarier than Rimikaru, but criticized Heather Hogan's British accent as putting off. Gelo Gonzales of FHM ranked Ayame and Rikimaru as well as Tatsumaru from Tenchu 2 at fourth place on his 2009 list of most memorable hitmen in gaming, and Complex included Rikimaru and Ayame from Tenchu 3 among their favourite video game stealth killers, rhetorically asking in 2010: "When's the last time you saw a male/female duo this brutally deadly?" Jack Chambers of WhatCulture put them both at seventh spot on his 2012 list of unstoppable assassins in video games, opining that "the deadly combination of Rikimaru and Ayame hasn’t rarely been matched in any game since" the original Tenchu.

Some praise focused on Ayame individually. Robin Anne Reid, Professor in the Department of Literature and Languages at Texas A&M University–Commerce, featured Ayame in her 2009 listing of "notable" playable female character in video games and UGO included Ayame among "25 of the hottest (and deadliest) ninja assassin chicks" in 2011. In 2013, she was included among the ten best video game "ninjas" by Jon Ledford of Sushi Arcade, who stated that "Rikimaru might have been the frontman for the Tenchu franchise, but Ayame’s teenage-look and the variety in her stealth kills made her a fan favorite." Márcio Pacheco Alexsandro of GameHall placed Tenchu'''s Ayame and Rin together at eight spot on his 2014 top list of female ninja characters in video games.

According to GamesRadar, Ayame "was a cool, relatively realistic-looking heroine in an era when polygonal female protagonists were largely defined by the enormity of the crude pyramids that passed for their tits." GamePro included Ayame in their 2010 top list of video game ninja characters at ninth place, calling her "the stealthiest assassin on our list" and "the perfect ninja", and noting her for possessing "a body that matches her profession, rather than a stripper or blowup doll (stand up Taki and Mai Shiranui)." On the other hand, Joystiq's Eric Caoli commented on her miniskirt that "while this outfit is nowhere near as scandalous as what Tecmo's female ninjas have been wearing" in the Ninja Gaiden and Dead or Alive series, "we still have to question the appropriateness of Ayame's Tenchu 4'' garb."

See also
Ninja in popular culture

References

External links
Ayame (video game character) at GiantBomb
UGO's Ninja Guide | Rikimaru and Ayame of Tenchu at UGO.com

Action-adventure game characters
Adoptee characters in video games
Fantasy video game characters
Female characters in video games
Fictional assassins in video games
Fictional female ninja
Fictional Japanese people in video games
Fictional swordfighters in video games
Ninja characters in video games
Orphan characters in video games
Tenchu
Video game characters introduced in 1998
Video game characters who can turn invisible
Video game characters who use magic
Woman soldier and warrior characters in video games
Fictional people from the 16th-century